Gerard Finton David Cosby (May 15, 1909 in Roxbury, Massachusetts – November 26, 1996) was an American ice hockey player and businessman. Cosby played goaltender for the Massachusetts Rangers, the team that won the 1933 World Ice Hockey Championships, representing the United States of America. His outstanding performance (allowing one goal in five games) helped lead the United States to its first, and only, gold medal at the World Ice Hockey Championships.

In the late 1930s, he played for the New York Rovers of the Eastern League. He later served as a practice goaltender for the New York Rangers, New York Americans and Boston Bruins of the National Hockey League. In 1935 he was voted most valuable player while tending goal for the Wembley Lions in England. In 1936 he was invited to join the United States Olympic team but he was unable to accept. He also represented his country at the 1938 World Ice Hockey Championships in Prague, Czechoslovakia, where the Americans finished in seventh place.

In 1938, he founded the successful sporting goods and athletic equipment company, Gerry Cosby & Co.,  along with his brother John, which had its headquarters at Madison Square Garden in New York. The company supplies hockey equipment to amateur and professional teams throughout North America.

He was inducted into the International Ice Hockey Federation Hall of Fame in 1997 and was introduced into the IIHF All-Time USA Team in 2020.

External links
 IIHF Hockey Hall of Fame bio
 New York Times obituary

1909 births
1996 deaths
American men's ice hockey goaltenders
Ice hockey players from Massachusetts
IIHF Hall of Fame inductees
People from Roxbury, Boston